is a Japanese actress, singer and model best known for her appearances in the Sailor Moon musicals series.

Career
She starred in the Sailor Moon musicals as the lead role of Usagi Tsukino at the age of 12 and finished her Sailor Moon career at 16 in 2005. She also figured in other musicals, such as Rock 'n Jam musicals. She has published photobooks, DVDs and CDs (mostly from the Sailor Moon musicals).

She recently moved to J-Pop and sang songs used in various anime Series. One of notable ones is in the Anime Onegai My Melody ~Kuru Kuru Shuffle!~.

Personal life 
Kuroki was born in Tokyo, Japan.

Sailor Moon musicals
Tanjou ~ Ankoku no Princess Black Lady + revision,
Ai no Sanctuary,
Mugen Gakuen ~ Mistress Labyrinth + revision,
Starlights ~ Ryuusei Densetsu
Kakyuu-Ouhi Kourin
Shin Kaguya Shima Densetsu + revision

Mymelody Musicals
Kirikirisu
Koikuru

References

External links
Official web site (in Japanese)

Japanese actresses
Japanese gravure idols
Japanese television personalities
Japanese women pop singers
1988 births
Living people
Anime musicians
21st-century Japanese singers
21st-century Japanese women singers